Attila Ábrahám (born 29 April 1967 in Kapuvár, Győr-Moson-Sopron) is a Hungarian sprint canoeist who competed from the late 1980s to the mid-1990s. Completing in two Summer Olympics, he won a complete set of medals (gold - 1988: K-4 1000 m, silver - 1992: K-4 1000 m, bronze - 1988: K-2 500 m).

Ábrahám also won ten medals at the ICF Canoe Sprint World Championships with five golds (K-2 10000 m: 1989, 1993; K-4 1000 m: 1989, 1990, 1991), three silvers (K-4 500 m: 1991, K-4 1000 m: 1993, 1995), and two bronzes (K-4 500 m: 1990, 1993).

References

External links 
 
 
 

1967 births
Living people
Canoeists at the 1988 Summer Olympics
Canoeists at the 1992 Summer Olympics
Hungarian male canoeists
Olympic canoeists of Hungary
Olympic gold medalists for Hungary
Olympic silver medalists for Hungary
Olympic bronze medalists for Hungary
Olympic medalists in canoeing
ICF Canoe Sprint World Championships medalists in kayak
Medalists at the 1992 Summer Olympics
Medalists at the 1988 Summer Olympics